Barnwall may refer to:

Barnwall Manor

See also
Barnewall (disambiguation)